Averías is a municipality and village in the General Taboada department, province of Santiago del Estero Province in Argentina. It is located approximately 229 km from the provincial capital city of Santiago del Estero.

Averías had 162 inhabitants in 2001. (INDEC, 2001)

References

External links
 Federal website
 Provincial website
 Geographical coordinates and satellite images of Averías

Populated places in Santiago del Estero Province